The  is based at JGSDF Camp Kisarazu in Kisarazu, in Chiba Prefecture. Formerly an independent brigade, it was attached to the Central Readiness Force on March 28, 2007. Like most JGSDF units, the brigade's aircraft are deployed to conduct exercises from their Kisarazu base annually during the New Year period.

The brigade operates under the Ground Component Command, formerly with the Central Readiness Force, as a supporting unit for the Central Readiness Regiment (CRR), 1st Airborne Brigade and the Japanese Special Forces Group (SFGp) if deployed into a combat zone. 

Prior to the brigade's integration into the CRF, it had been actively involved in civil disaster operations in response to natural disasters such as wildfire, earthquakes, and flood.

History
The 1st Helicopter Brigade was first established on March 20, 1959, by the Japan Ground Self-Defense Force Aviation School at JGSDF Camp Kasumigaura in Kasumigaura, Ibaraki. After the brigade was established, two helicopter companies were created on March 1, 1968, during a period of reorganization.

The 1st Helicopter Company was stationed at JGSDF Camp Kisarazu on March 22, 1968, with the 2nd Helicopter Company arriving on June 1, 1968. A special transport squad was established in the brigade on December 19, 1986. Another period of reorganization began on March 27, 2006, when a communications and reconnaissance squad was added to the unit. On March 28, 2007, the 1st Helicopter Brigade was formally incorporated into the Central Readiness Force.

The brigade was deployed by the Central Readiness Force on its first operation to subdue wildfires in the forests of the Yamanashi Prefecture on April 29, 2007. They have been also deployed on humanitarian operations, specifically in the aftermath of the March 2011 earthquake.

On March 26, 2020, the 1HB has established an aviation corp to manage V-22 Ospreys for the ARDB. The Ospreys are due to be deployed to Kisarazu with plans to be deployed at Saga Airport in the future. One CH-47J helicopter squadron is to be at JGSDF Vice Camp Takayubaru.

Aircraft in service

The 1st Helicopter Brigade currently utilize the following aircraft for the Ground Component Command:

Formation
Headquarters
 Headquarters and Service Company (OH-6D)
1st Transportation Helicopter Group
 103rd Flight Squadron (CH-47J/JA)
 104th Flight Squadron (CH-47J/JA)
 105th Flight Squadron (CH-47J/JA)
 106th Flight Squadron (CH-47J/JA)
102nd Flight Squadron (UH-60JA, OH-6D)
Special transportation helicopter Squadron (EC 225LP)
Communications and Reconnaissance Squadron (LR-1, LR-2)
Field Maintenance Party

References

External links
 1st Helicopter Brigade's Official Page 
 

Japan Ground Self-Defense Force Brigade
Military units and formations established in 1959
Helicopter units and formations
1959 establishments in Japan